This is a list of airlines currently operating in Seychelles:

See also
 List of airports in Seychelles
 List of companies based in Seychelles

References

Seychelles
Airlines
Airlines
Seychelles